Günyazı is a village in the Şemdinli District in Hakkâri Province in Turkey. The village is populated by Kurds of the Zerzan tribe and had a population of 1,465 in 2022.

The hamlets of Olgunlar and Yeniceli are attached to the village. Çalışkanlar was a hamlet of Günyazı until 2022.

Population 
Population history of the village from 2000 to 2022:

References 

Villages in Şemdinli District
Kurdish settlements in Hakkâri Province